William Hone may refer to:
William Hone, writer
William Hone (cricketer) (1842–1919), cricketer 
William Hone Junior, cricketer